Van Vredenburg Farm is a historic home and farm complex located at Rhinebeck, Dutchess County, New York.  The farmhouse was built about 1830 and is a -story, five-bay frame building in the Greek Revival style. The main block is flanked by -story wings.  It is topped by a gable roof and sits on a raised stone foundation. It features a 1-story, hipped roof front porch with open woodwork and cross motif dated to the 1880s.  Also on the property are a contributing barn, two sheds, a well, two cisterns, and a wagon house.

It was added to the National Register of Historic Places in 1987.

References

Houses on the National Register of Historic Places in New York (state)
Greek Revival houses in New York (state)
Houses completed in 1830
Houses in Rhinebeck, New York
1830 establishments in New York (state)
National Register of Historic Places in Dutchess County, New York